Álvaro Antonio García Pérez (born 23 February 1975), known professionally as Álvaro Morte, is a Spanish actor. He gained worldwide recognition for playing the role of 'The Professor' in the television series Money Heist.

Early life 
Álvaro Antonio García Pérez was born on 23 February 1975 in Algeciras, province of Cádiz, soon relocating to Bujalance, province of Córdoba, with his family.

Originally enrolled into a degree of communications engineering, he switched to dramatic art, graduating from the Escuela Superior de Arte Dramático de Córdoba in 1999. He also took post-graduate studies at the University of Tampere. After his time in Finland, he settled in Madrid. At the age of 33, he was diagnosed with a cancerous tumour in the left thigh, which he ultimately overcame.

Career
Morte began his acting career when he played a minor role in the Spanish television series Hospital Central. He landed his first main role in a TV series in Planta 25, aired on a number of Spanish regional TV broadcasters and in which he played Ray—a driver—from 2007 to 2008. He then played Adolfo Castillo in the Spanish television series Bandolera, Gabriel Areta in the soap opera Amar en tiempos revueltos.

Morte performed a minor role in Lola, la película (2007), a biopic film about the folkloric singer Lola Flores in which he briefly portrayed a bullfighter, lover of the protagonist.

In addition to his acting work, Morte owns a theatre company called 300 pistolas (English: 300 pistols), founded in 2012.

Morte joined the cast of the long-running telenovela El secreto de Puente Viejo in 2014, portraying Lucas Moliner—a small-town physician—until 2017.

Following his exit from Puente Viejo, Morte played the role of Sergio "el Profesor" Marquina in the television series La Casa de Papel. The first season aired on Antena 3 in 2017. He was heavily praised for his portrayal of the character—the meticulous criminal mastermind behind the heist plot central to the series—and has gained, along with the television series, worldwide fame. In late 2017, Netflix acquired the series and distributed it worldwide on its platform. Part two of the final season were released in December 2021.

He landed his first main role in a feature film in the Netflix film Mirage (2018).

Morte starred in the 2019 Movistar+ television series El embarcadero, playing Óscar, a man who has lived a double life by living with two different women separatedly. In December 2019, Morte was announced to have joined the cast of the Amazon television series The Wheel of Time, an adaption of the epic fantasy novels of the same name, set to portray Logain.

In April 2021, he was announced to have been cast as Juan Sebastián Elcano in the miniseries Sin límites.

Filmography

Films

Television

Awards and nominations

References

External links

 

1975 births
20th-century Spanish male actors
21st-century Spanish male actors
Living people
People from Algeciras
Spanish businesspeople
Spanish male film actors
Spanish male television actors